Deinandra kelloggii, Kellogg's spikeweed or Kellogg's tarweed, is a North American species of plant in the tribe Madieae within the family Asteraceae. It is native to Baja California, southern and central California (from Sonoma and Calaveras Counties south to San Diego County), and Arizona (Pima County).

Deinandra kelloggii is an annual herb, sometimes growing to a height of 150 cm (5 feet). The plant produces numerous flower heads, each with 5 yellow ray florets and 6 disc florets with yellow corollas but with yellow, red, brown, or maroon anthers.

References

External links
Calflora Database: Deinandra kelloggii (Kellogg's tarweed)

kelloggii
Flora of California
Flora of Arizona
Flora of Baja California
Natural history of the California chaparral and woodlands
Natural history of the Central Valley (California)
Natural history of the Transverse Ranges
Plants described in 1883
Taxa named by Edward Lee Greene
Flora without expected TNC conservation status